This article contains a partial list of temporary exhibitions mounted at the Royal Academy (RA) in London. Only major lending exhibitions are listed: shorter-term events such as the London Original Print Fair are not included, nor are the annual Royal Academy Summer Exhibitions.

Note: the list is known to be incomplete prior to 1987.

In addition to its main galleries behind Burlington House, The RA has additional galleries within the Sackler Wing. Sitting above Burlington House, these galleries (formerly the Diploma galleries) were incorporated within the main building in a scheme designed by Foster Associates. The first exhibition held in these galleries, incorporating the humidity and light controls required of modern exhibition spaces, was the Fauve Landscape in 1991.

History

The RA has held a Summer exhibition every year since 1769, the year after it was founded. For the first 100 years of its existence, this was the only exhibition held each year. In 1870, coinciding with its move to Burlington House, the RA began organising an annual loan exhibition of Old Masters and works by recently deceased British artists, known from its inception and for many years as the Winter Exhibition. After World War 1 the Winter Exhibitions programme became far more ambitious and included major surveys of Italian, Dutch, Flemish, Spanish, French, Persian and British art. Since 2013, the RA has made digitized catalogues of the pre-1939 exhibitions freely available on its website.

Exhibitions

References

Royal Academy